Nováček (feminine Nováčková) is a Czech surname (a diminutive of Novák). Notable people include:

 Jay Novacek (born 1962), an American Football tight end of Czech descent
 Jitka Nováčková, Czech model
 Karel Nováček (born 1965), a Czech tennis player
 Libor Nováček (born 1979), a Czech-English violinist, poet
 Ottokar Nováček (1866 - 1900), a Hungarian violinist and composer of Czech descent
 Roman Nováček (born 1969), a Czech judo-player
 Rudolf Nováček (1860-1929), a Czech composer and conductor
 Stephanie Novacek (born 1970), an American operatic mezzo-soprano of Czech descent
 Viktor Nováček (born 1875), a Czech violinist and music pedagog
 Zuzana Nováčková, Czech printmaker

See also 
 Novák
 Nowak

Czech-language surnames